The third season of La Voz Kids premiered on March 22 of 2021, being the first season of this spin-off in Mexico to be produced and broadcast by Azteca Uno. The coaches this season are Belinda, who returns for a fourth season (2 regulars, 1 senior), María José, in her second season and the debut as coaches for Camilo and the duet of Mau y Ricky. Eddy Vilard returns as hot of the season, being the first time that he would not be accompanied by Sofía Aragón at the backstage.

Coaches

Teams 
Color key

 Winner
 Runner-up
 Eliminated in the Final
 Eliminated in the Semifinal
 Eliminated in the Knockouts

Blind auditions 
In the Blind auditions, each coach had to complete their teams with 15 contestants.

Episode 1 (March 22) 

At the beginning of the episode, the coaches performed a Spanish version of "Just the Way You Are"

Episode 2 (March 23) 

During the episode, María José performed "Él era perfecto"

Episode 3 (March 29) 

During the episode, Camilo performed "Favorito"

Episode 4 (March 30) 

During the episode, Mau y Ricky performed "Perdóname"

Episode 5 (April 5) 

During the episode, María José performed "El amor coloca" and Belinda performed "Bella traición"

References 

Mexico
2021 Mexican television seasons